Devario leptos is a freshwater fish found in the Nam Tha and Nam Beng watersheds in Laos.

References

Cyprinid fish of Asia
Fish of Laos
Fish described in 1999
Devario